Paul Newman  (born 1973) is a British engineer and academic, the BP Professor of Information Engineering at the University of Oxford, and a Fellow of Keble College, Oxford. He is head of the Oxford Mobile Robotics Group (MRG) and CTO at Oxbotica.

Newman received an MEng in Engineering Science from Balliol College, Oxford in 1995, followed by a PhD in autonomous navigation from the Australian Centre for Field Robotics, University of Sydney, Australia.

In 2014, he co-founded Oxbotica with Ingmar Posner.

Career and Research 
Newman’s work on autonomous vehicle technology has led him to author 200 papers and garner over 15,000 citations. He has an h-index of 72 according to Google Scholar. In his doctoral dissertation at the University of Sydney, Paul set out the fundamentals of the large-scale navigation problem SLAM, which would later become one of the most cited papers in the field at over 3,000 citations.

Following his PhD in 1999 under Hugh F. Durrant-Whyte, Newman worked as a Navigation Engineer at Sonardyne International, UK, in 1999 and 2000, where he wrote the navigation algorithms which underpinned operation of autonomous sub-sea vehicles dealing with the Deepwater Horizon oil spill.

In 2003, Newman left industry for MIT, where he was a postdoctorate research scientist, working with Professor John J. Leonard on large-scale field robotics both on land and in the ocean.

He became a Departmental Lecturer in Engineering Science at the University of Oxford in 2003, and set up the Mobile Robotics Group, a sub-division of the Oxford Robotics Institute, where he developed partnerships with BAE Systems and Nissan. In 2005, he was elected a fellow of New College Oxford where he was a Tutorial Fellow until 2012.

In 2010, Newman was awarded an EPSRC Leadership Fellowship. The flagship output was the “Robotcar”, which in 2013 became the first autonomous vehicle permitted on public roads in the UK. In 2014, Newman leveraged the newly developed technology and, with the Robotcar team, co-founded Oxbotica.

Advisory Roles and Fellowships 
Newman currently serves on the UK Government’s Department for Transport Scientific Advisory Council. Newman was elected a Fellow of the Royal Academy of Engineering and Fellow of the IEEE in 2014, both with citations for "outstanding contributions to robot navigation".

From 2019 to 2022 Newman was a member of the Prime Minister’s Council for Science and Technology. He advised Boris Johnson and Liz Truss on science policy. Johnson resigned in summer 2022 and Truss soon after being appointed.

References

Living people
Fellows of Keble College, Oxford
Fellows of New College, Oxford
British electronics engineers
Alumni of Balliol College, Oxford
University of Sydney alumni
Fellows of the Royal Academy of Engineering
Fellow Members of the IEEE
1973 births